"Mali čovek" ("Little Man") is the first and only single by Yugoslav new wave band Šarlo Akrobata released in 1981.

Track listing 

Both tracks written by Šarlo Akrobata

"Mali čovek" 
"Ona se budi"

Personnel 

 Milan Mladenović
 Dušan Kojić Koja
 Ivica Vdović Vd

References 
 EX YU ROCK enciklopedija 1960-2006,  Janjatović Petar;  

1981 singles
1980 songs
Jugoton singles